Junhan Cho is a Korean physicist, currently at Dankook University and an Elected Fellow of the American Physical Society.

References

Year of birth missing (living people)
Living people
Academic staff of Dankook University
Chinese physicists
Fellows of the American Physical Society